Louis Sherman may refer to:

 Bud Sherman (Louis Ralph Sherman, 1926–2015), politician in Manitoba, Canada
 Louis Sherman (Pennsylvania politician), former Democratic member of the Pennsylvania House of Representatives
 Louis Sherman (bishop) (1886–1953), Anglican bishop in Canada
 Lou Sherman (1914-2001), politician in London, England